Wilco is an American rock band.

Wilco may also refer to:

 Wilco (given name), a Dutch masculine given name
 "Wilco", a radio procedure word, short for "Will Comply"; origin of the term
 Wilco (The Album), an album by the band Wilco, or the title song, "Wilco (The Song)"
 Wilco: Learning How to Die, a book about the band, by Greg Kot
 Wilco (farm supply cooperative), an American chain of agricultural stores in Oregon
 Wilco (tree), Anadenanthera colubrina, a South American tree
 Wilkinson County, Georgia, sometimes abbreviated as "Wilco"
 Williamson County, Texas, sometimes abbreviated as "Wilco"
Williamson County, Tennessee, sometimes abbreviated as "Wilco"
 WilcoHess, Trade-Wilco and "Wilco to go" were brands part of the gas station chain A.T. Williams Oil Co.
Rob Wilco, a character from the comic strip Get Fuzzy

See also
Wilko (disambiguation)
Roger Wilco (disambiguation)